Koji orange (Citrus leiocarpa), also called smooth-fruited orange in English, bingyul in Korean, 光橘 (Guang ju), 柑 子 (Gan zi), and 日本土柑 (Ri ben tu gan) in Chinese, and コウジ (Kōji) in Japanese, is a Citrus species native to Japan.

Distribution
Besides Japan, it is grown in the United States, and other parts of East Asia including South Korea and China.

Description
The fruit is oblate in shape, slightly ribbed, bright orange in color, very small, and very seedy, and for the latter two reasons it is not grown for commercial use. It ripens from October through November and has been cultivated since at least 1900. It may be monoembryonic. The tree is densely branched and has a broad crown and a short, straight trunk. The leaves are dark green and elliptical in shape.

Genetics
Citrus leiocarpa is inferred to be a hybrid between a koji-type species (seed parent) and the tachibana orange (pollen parent, Citrus tachibana). Its genotype matches with that of the komikan and toukan varieties.

Varieties
Citrus leiocarpa f. monoembryota, a form of Citrus leiocarpa, was described by Chozaburo Tanaka. Once believed to be a mutation of the koji orange, it has been revealed that it is a hybrid between koji (pollen parent) and kishu (seed parent). In Chinese, it is called 駿河柑子 (Jun he gan zi) and is called スルガユコウ (Suruga yukō) and 駿河柚柑 (Suruga yukō) in Japanese.

Taxonomy
It is treated as a synonym of Citrus aurantium in taxonomy.

See also
Japanese citrus
List of citrus fruits

References

Chinese fruit
Citrus
Citrus hybrids
Edible fruits
Flora of Japan
Fruit trees
Fruits originating in East Asia
Japanese fruit
Korean fruit
Oranges (fruit)
Orange cultivars
Plants described in 1927
Taxa named by Chozaburo Tanaka
Trees of Japan